RelA-associated inhibitor is a protein that in humans is encoded by the PPP1R13L gene.

Interactions 

PPP1R13L has been shown to interact with Sp1 transcription factor and RELA.

References

Further reading